Manur or Manoor (Tamil : மானூர்) is a Village in Manur taluk, Tirunelveli district, Tamil Nadu State, India. It is situated along State highway 41  (SH-41) between Tirunelveli and Sankarankovil on the Road. This Village is located 26 Kilometre North Side of  Tirunelveli.

Demographics 
According to the 2011 census, the village of manur had a population of 4348 with 2161 males and 2187 females. The village had a literacy rate of 71.7%. Child population in the age group below 6 was 239 Males and 210 Females.

See also
 Manur taluk
 Manur block

References 

Villages in Tirunelveli district